Deborah Sale Butler is an American voice actress, and a speech and dialect coach. She was born on October 31, 1964 in Pittsburgh, Pennsylvania. She later moved to California to pursue a voiceover career. Her hobbies are etch-a-sketch art, playing with her cats, and science fiction.  She is married to composer John Butler (born: June 25, 1964), and later gave birth to a son, Liam Butler (born: May 31, 2006), who was diagnosed with autism at the age of 3. Thus, she & her husband had decided to homeschooling their son when Liam reached the age of 8, & she kept a documental blog on, not just about how her son has progressed over the years, but her extraordinary life in homeschooling her Autistic child that she titled, We Aut To Be At Home, & continues to blog to this day.

Deborah is best known as the voice of Cecile Croomy from the Code Geass series, the lead role of Mai Shibamura from Gunparade March, Shute from SD Gundam, as well as the lead role of Layla Ashley from Avenger.

Notable roles

Anime
Appleseed as Scientist
Avenger as Layla Ashley
Busou Renkin as Chitose Tateyama
Code Geass: Lelouch of the Rebellion as Cécile Croomy
Ghost in the Shell: Stand Alone Complex as Varieties
Gunparade March as Mai Shibamura
Marmalade Boy as Akiko Kitahara; Yayoi's Friend 1
SD Gundam Force as Shute

Video game roles
Project Horned Owl as Kate L
SD Gundam Force: Showdown! as Shute
Fruity Pebbles Campaign as Wilma Flintstone
EverQuest as various characters
EverQuest II: Revamp as Trainer Marla Gilliam, Lieutenant Delsun, Lyssia, Delnara, Sevri Il' Bethod, Gunta and Emma Torque
World of Warcraft as various characters
I Love Bees Halo prequel" as Gilly
Slave Zero as Li
Starcon as Pkunk, Ship's Computer, Colonist
Heavy Gear 2 as Helene del Pulchiano
Civilization: Call to Power as Rebel Colonist
Shanghai: Second Dynasty as Computer, Babysitter
Shadow Tower as Featured Characters
Echo Night as Featured Characters
Where in the World is Carmen Sandiego? as Featured Characters
Where in the USA is Carmen Sandiego as Featured Characters
Write, Camera, Action as Bailey
James Discovers Math as Featured Characters
Morgan's Trivia Machine as Morgan, Hip Hop Hippo and Bernardvaark
Recess in Greece as Morgan, Hip Hop Hippo and Bernardvaark
Rising Zan: The Samurai Gunman as Valerie
The Revolutionary War as Morgan, Hip Hop Hippo and Bernardvaark
The Dirty Dwarves as Laura and Kyle
101 Dalmatians as Featured Characters
Star Trek: The Next Generation as Admiral Williams, Commander Likse
World of Final Fantasy as Undead Princess
Oil Rush as Assistant
Octopath Traveler as additional voices

References

External links
 
 

American voice actresses
American child actresses
1964 births
Living people
Actresses from Pittsburgh
21st-century American women